Washington Pass (el. 5477 ft./1669 m.) and Rainy Pass (el. 4875 ft./1486 m.) are two mountain passes on State Route 20 (North Cascades Highway) in the North Cascades mountains of Washington state. Rainy Pass is about 4 miles to the west of Washington Pass.  The passes are typically closed between November and April due to heavy snowfall.

The north–south Pacific Crest Trail crosses east-west Highway 20 at Rainy Pass.

Climate
Washington and Rainy Passes are located in the marine west coast climate zone of western North America. Most weather fronts originate in the Pacific Ocean, and travel northeast toward the Cascade Mountains. As fronts approach the North Cascades, they are forced upward by the peaks of the Cascade Range (Orographic lift), causing them to drop their moisture in the form of rain or snowfall onto the Cascades. As a result, the west side of the North Cascades experiences high precipitation, especially during the winter months in the form of snowfall. During winter months, weather is usually cloudy, but, due to high pressure systems over the Pacific Ocean that intensify during summer months, there is often little or no cloud cover during the summer. Because of maritime influence, snow tends to be wet and heavy, resulting in high avalanche danger. The North Cascades Highway east of Washington Pass has the distinction of being among the top areas in the United States for most avalanche paths per mile of highway.

References

External links
—Washington Pass
—Rainy Pass
Pass road conditions from WSDOT

Mountain passes of Chelan County, Washington
Mountain passes of Washington (state)
Mountain passes of the North Cascades
Mountain passes of Okanogan County, Washington
Transportation in Chelan County, Washington
Transportation in Okanogan County, Washington